Speckled skink may refer to:

 Oligosoma infrapunctatum, from New Zealand
 Trachylepis punctulata, from Africa, otherwise known as speckled sand skink

See also
Skink

Animal common name disambiguation pages